Cheddite is a class of explosive materials invented in 1897 by E. A. G. Street of the firm of Berges, Corbin et Cie and originally manufactured in the town of Chedde in Haute-Savoie, France in the early twentieth century.

Closely related to Sprengel explosives, cheddites consisted of a high proportion of inorganic chlorates mixed with nitroaromatics (e.g. nitrobenzene or dinitrotoluene) plus a little paraffin or castor oil as a moderant for the chlorate. Several different types were made, and they were principally used in quarrying. Due to availability of ingredients and easy production process it was also the most common explosive material manufactured by the Polish Underground State in occupied Poland during World War II; it was used for production of the R wz. 42 and Filipinka hand grenades. 

Since the 1970s, Cheddite is the commercial name for primers CX series (CX 50, CX 1000 and CX 2000) for shotgun cartridges.

See also
 Sprengel explosive
 Boxer Primer

References

Explosives